2-C-Methyl-D-erythritol 2,4-cyclodiphosphate synthase (MEcPP synthase, IspF, EC 4.6.1.12) is a zinc-dependent enzyme and a member of the YgbB N terminal protein domain, which participates in the MEP pathway (non-mevalonate pathway) of isoprenoid precursor biosynthesis. It catalyzes the following reaction:

4-diphosphocytidyl-2-C-methyl-D)erythritol 2-phosphate  2-C-methyl-D-erythritol 2,4-cyclodiphosphate + CMP

The enzyme is considered a phosphorus-oxygen lyase.  The systematic name of this enzyme class is 2-phospho-4-(cytidine 5′-diphospho)-2-C-methyl-D-D-erythritol CMP-lyase (cyclizing; 2-C-methyl-D-erythritol 2,4-cyclodiphosphate-forming). Other names in common use include IspF, YgbB and MEcPP synthase.

Structural studies

References

EC 4.6.1
Enzymes of known structure